The 2000 United States presidential election in Iowa took place on November 7, 2000, and was part of the 2000 United States presidential election. Voters chose seven representatives, or electors to the Electoral College, who voted for President and Vice President.

Iowa was won by Democratic Vice President Al Gore by a margin of 0.32% and 4,200 votes over Republican Texas Governor George W. Bush, with Green Party candidate Ralph Nader taking 2.23% of the vote.

Gore's win in Iowa marked the fourth consecutive victory for Democrats in the Hawkeye State, and the first time since 1988 that the state did not vote for the national winner, a feat which would not occur again until 2020. Along with the 1988 election, this remains the second (and last) of only two times in history that a Republican was elected president without carrying Iowa as neither George W. Bush nor George H. W. Bush carried the state on their first run for the presidency.  This is the only state that Gore won in 2000 that Joe Biden lost in his successful bid for the presidency in 2020.  

As of 2020, this is the last time that Iowa has voted more Democratic than neighboring Wisconsin, as well as the last time the state voted differently than Florida and Ohio.

Natural Law Party nominee John Hagelin had his strongest county-level showing in his home county of Jefferson County, Iowa, where he garnered 14.7% of the vote. However, he came in sixth statewide, and his vote total was less than the narrow margin separating Gore and Bush.

Caucuses
 2000 Iowa Democratic presidential caucuses
 2000 Iowa Republican presidential caucuses

Results

By county

Counties that flipped from Democratic to Republican
Adair (Largest city: Greenfield)
Adams (Largest city: Corning)
Allamakee (Largest city: Waukon)
Appanoose (Largest city: Centerville)
Audubon (Largest city: Audubon)
Bremer (Largest city: Waverly)
Butler (Largest city: Parkersburg)
Calhoun (Largest city: Rockwell City)
Carroll (Largest city: Carroll)
Cherokee (Largest city: Cherokee)
Clay (Largest city: Spencer)
Crawford (Largest city: Denison)
Dallas (Largest city: Waukee)
Davis (Largest city: Bloomfield)
Decatur (Largest city: Lamoni)
Delaware (Largest city: Manchester)
Dickinson (Largest city: Spirit Lake)
Emmet (Largest city: Estherville)
Fayette (Largest city: Oelwein)
Franklin (Largest city: Hampton)
Guthrie (Largest city: Guthrie Center)
Hamilton (Largest city: Webster City)
Hancock (Largest city: Garner)
Hardin (Largest city: Iowa Falls)
Henry (Largest city: Mount Pleasant)
Iowa (Largest city: Williamsburg)
Jasper (Largest city: Newton)
Jefferson (Largest city: Fairfield)
Keokuk (Largest city: Sigourney)
Kossuth (Largest city: Algona)
Lucas (Largest city: Chariton)
Madison (Largest city: Winterset)
Marshall (Largest city: Marshalltown)
Monona (Largest city: Onawa)
Monroe (Largest city: Albia)
Palo Alto (Largest city: Emmetsburg)
Pocahontas (Largest city: Pocahontas)
Poweshiek (Largest city: Grinnell)
Ringgold (Largest city: Mount Ayr)
Taylor (Largest city: Bedford)
Union (Largest city: Creston)
Van Buren (Largest city: Keosauqua)
Warren (Largest city: Indianola)
Washington (Largest city: Washington)
Wayne (Largest city: Corydon)
Winneshiek (Largest city: Decorah)
Woodbury (Largest city: Sioux City)
Wright (Largest city: Eagle Grove)

By congressional district
Bush won 3 of 5 congressional districts, including one held by a Democrat. Gore won two districts, both held by Republicans.

Electors

Technically the voters of Iowa cast their ballots for electors: representatives to the Electoral College. Iowa is allocated 7 electors because it has 5 congressional districts and 2 senators. All candidates who appear on the ballot or qualify to receive write-in votes must submit a list of 7 electors, who pledge to vote for their candidate and his or her running mate. Whoever wins the majority of votes in the state is awarded all 7 electoral votes. Their chosen electors then vote for President and Vice President. Although electors are pledged to their candidate and running mate, they are not obligated to vote for them. An elector who votes for someone other than his or her candidate is known as a faithless elector.

The electors of each state and the District of Columbia met on December 18, 2000 to cast their votes for President and Vice President. The Electoral College itself never meets as one body. Instead the electors from each state and the District of Columbia met in their respective capitols.

The following were the members of the Electoral College from the state. All were pledged to and voted for Al Gore and Joe Lieberman:
Jeff Heland
Angelyn King
Paulee Lipsman
Emil Pavich
John O'Brien
Ernest Ricehill
Evan Giesen
David Tingwald

See also
 United States presidential elections in Iowa

References

2000
Presidential